Ka (К к; italics: К к) is a letter of the Cyrillic script.

It commonly represents the voiceless velar plosive /k/, like the pronunciation of ⟨k⟩ in "king" or "kick".

History
The Cyrillic letter Ka was derived from the Greek letter Kappa (Κ κ).

In the Cyrillic numeral system, Ka had a value of 20.

Form
The Cyrillic letter Ka looks very similar, and corresponds to the Latin letter K. In many fonts, Cyrillic Ka is differentiated from its Latin and Greek counterparts by drawing one or both of its diagonal spurs with curved instead of straight. Also in some fonts the lowercase form of Ka has the vertical bar elongated above x-height, resembling the Latin lowercase k.

Usage
In Russian, the letter Ka represents the plain voiceless velar plosive  or the palatalized one ; for example, the word короткий ("short") contains both the kinds: . The palatalized variant is pronounced when the following letter in the word is ь, е, ё, и, ю, or я.
 
In Macedonian and Serbian it always represents the sound .

Related letters and other similar characters
Κ κ/ : Greek letter Kappa
K k : Latin letter K
Q q : Latin letter Q
C c : Latin letter C
X x : Latin letter X

Computing codes

See also
Ka with descender
Ka with hook
Ka with stroke
Ka with vertical stroke
Aleut Ka
Bashkir Ka
Kje

External links

 On the Aorists in -κα. By R. G. Latham, Esq., M.D.

References